Redcar Racecourse is a thoroughbred horse racing venue located in Redcar, North Yorkshire, England.  The racecourse was opened in 1872.

History
Racing began at Redcar on the sands at Redcar beach in the early 18th century.  The final meeting here was in 1870.  In 1872, Redcar Racecourse as it stands today was opened with a Grandstand erected in 1876. Between 1913 and 1923, Redcar F.C. was based at the racecourse.

During the First World War and the Second World War the racecourse was used as both an airfield and an army camp. In 1945 after the Second World War, Major Leslie Petch OBE managed the racecourse and revamped the neglected course.  Redcar was the first racecourse in the UK to have both a timing clock and furlong posts.  Under Petch's stewardship, a new grandstand was erected in 1964.  This stand is still at the racecourse today.

Following his retirement, the Zetland family took control of the racecourse.  Lord Zetland introduced the Two-Year-Old Trophy race.  Notable winners of this most lucrative race at Redcar include Pipalong, Captain Rio, Somnus and Limato.

Zetland sold part of the Redcar Racecourse land to supermarket chain, Safeway, for £3.6 million in order to finance major developments on the racecourse including new stables.

On 30 July 1980, prolific owner Sheikh Hamdan bin Rashid Al Maktoum had his first winner in the UK with Mushref.

In 1996, International Racecourse Management took control of the racecourse.  The nephew of Major Leslie Petch, John Sanderson, became chairman in 2018.

The Course
Redcar is a left handed flat oval of just over 1m 4f with relatively tight banked bends. There is also a 3f chute that joins the track where the top bend meets the straight, providing a 1m straight course, purported to be the only 'Straight Mile' in the UK that is straight and level.

Notable races

References 

 
Horse racing venues in England
Horse racing venues in Yorkshire
Sports venues in North Yorkshire
Buildings and structures in Redcar and Cleveland